The Fundación River is a river in northern Colombia, originating from the Sierra Nevada de Santa Marta in the Cesar Department but flows down to the Magdalena Department crossing the town and municipality of Fundación before reaching the Ciénaga Grande de Santa Marta.

References
data.ecology.su.se - Ciénaga Grande de Santa Marta
Parques Nacionales de Colombia; Santuario de Floray Fauna Cienaga Grande de Santa Marta

Rivers of Colombia
Sierra Nevada de Santa Marta